Jonathan Marín Cermeño (born ) is a Colombian male  track cyclist. He competed in the sprint and keirin event at the 2012 UCI Track Cycling World Championships.

References

External links
 
 

1982 births
Living people
Colombian track cyclists
Colombian male cyclists
Place of birth missing (living people)
Cyclists at the 2011 Pan American Games
Pan American Games medalists in cycling
Pan American Games silver medalists for Colombia
Pan American Games bronze medalists for Colombia
Central American and Caribbean Games gold medalists for Colombia
Central American and Caribbean Games silver medalists for Colombia
Competitors at the 2002 Central American and Caribbean Games
Central American and Caribbean Games medalists in cycling
Medalists at the 2011 Pan American Games
20th-century Colombian people
21st-century Colombian people
Competitors at the 2006 Central American and Caribbean Games